The 1942 Montenegro offensive was an Italian-led counter-insurgency operation of World War II, which targeted the Yugoslav Partisans in the Italian governorate of Montenegro and the eastern Herzegovina region of the Independent State of Croatia (NDH). It was carried out from mid-May to June 1942, with Chetnik forces taking part on the Italian side. The offensive followed the conclusion of the joint German-Italian Operation Trio in eastern Bosnia. Together these two operations comprise what was known as the Third Enemy Offensive in Yugoslav historiography.

The offensive resulted in the expulsion of almost all Partisans from Montenegro and eastern Herzegovina.

See also
 Anti-partisan operations in World War II
 Resistance during World War II

Footnotes

References

 
 
 
 

 

Seven Enemy Offensives
Battles and operations of World War II
Yugoslavia in World War II
Anti-partisan operations of World War II
Battles involving the Yugoslav Partisans
Trio
1942 in Yugoslavia
Conflicts in 1942
Battles of World War II involving Chetniks
1942 in Bosnia and Herzegovina
1942 in Montenegro
May 1942 events
June 1942 events